Ultimul cartuș (The Last Cartridge, The Last Bullet) is a 1973 Romanian crime film directed by Sergiu Nicolaescu. It is about commissioner Roman, portrayed by Ilarion Ciobanu, who is trying to revenge his partner's death.

Plot
Mihai Roman, the partner of ex-commissioner Miclovan, tries hard to put Miclovan's assassin, Semanca, portrayed by George Constantin, behind bars. Because the court didn't have enough evidence, Semanca is set free. In his desperate efforts to imprison Semanca, Mihai Roman receives another mission and another partner at the same time. The new partner, Oarca, seems to be an ex-servant who is good at everything, moreover he is one of the best at driving on serpentines.

Cast
 Ilarion Ciobanu as Mihai Roman
 George Constantin as Constantin Semaca
 Amza Pellea as Jean Semaca
 Sebastian Papaiani as Ilie Oarca
 Marga Barbu as Mrs. Semaca
 Ion Besoiu as Secretar de partid
 Colea Răutu as Bănică
 Jean Constantin as Floaca
  as Evelyne
 
 Mitzura Arghezi
 Ernest Maftei as commissioner Drăgan

References

External links
 
 Ultimul cartuș 
 Ultimul cartuș
 Ultimul cartuș on FilmeNoua.com

1973 films
1973 crime films
1970s Romanian-language films
Films directed by Sergiu Nicolaescu
Romanian crime films